Baixa-Chiado is an interchange station where the Blue and Green Lines of the Lisbon Metro connect, being located under Rua Ivens between Baixa and Chiado, hence its name.

History
The station opened on April 25, 1998 with service on the Green Line; the Blue Line platforms opened on August 8, 1998. It was designed by the Pritzker architect Álvaro Siza Vieira.

Connections

Urban buses and Interurban buses

Carris 
 28E Martim Moniz ⇄ Campo de Ourique (Prazeres)
 202 Cais do Sodré ⇄ Bairro Padre Cruz (morning service)
 711 Terreiro do Paço ⇄ Alto da Damaia
 736 Cais do Sodré ⇄ Odivelas (Bairro Dr. Lima Pimentel)
 758 Cais do Sodré ⇄ Portas de Benfica

See also
 List of Lisbon metro stations

References

External links

Blue Line (Lisbon Metro) stations
Green Line (Lisbon Metro) stations
Railway stations opened in 1998
1998 establishments in Portugal